The Jerusalem Pilgrim's Cross (Latin: Signum Sacri Itineris Hierosolymitani) is an honour awarded in the name of the Pope as a recognition of merit to pilgrims to the Holy Land.

The decoration is worn on the left side of the chest. It should not be worn except in religious solemnities, processions, pilgrimages, or in the presence of the Pope.

History
The Signum Sacri Itineris Hierosolymitani was established by Pope Leo XIII on 2 May 1901 to honour and to endorse pilgrimage to the Holy Places of Christianity in Palestine.

A certificate from a parish pastor was originally needed to attest to the morality of the candidate and affirm that there was a pious motive to undertake the voyage. , a certificate is no longer needed. The medal is never sent and can only be conferred at the office of the Custodian of the Holy Land in Jerusalem, belonging to the Franciscan Order. He presents it in the name of the Sovereign Pontiff. The grade depends on the number of trips the recipient has made to the city and whether appropriate suggested donations to the Franciscans have been made.

Insignia
The medal is a Jerusalem cross in gold, silver or bronze. The centre of the front is a small depiction of Pope Leo XIII with the surrounding Latin inscription LEO XIII CREAVIT ANNO MCM (Leo XIII created [this medal] in 1900). In the crossbars, there are four biblical scenes showing the early life and the ministry of Jesus with the inscription CHRISTI AMOR CRUCIFIXI TRAXIT NOS (Christ's love attracted us):

 Annunciation
 Nativity of Jesus
 Baptism of Jesus
 Eucharist

In the center of the reverse, there is the image of the risen Christ. The crossbars show four scenes of the Passion with the inscription SIGNUM SACRI ITINERIS HIEROSOL[YMITANI] (Sign of the holy voyage of Jerusalem): 
 Jesus praying in the Garden of Gethsemane
 Flagellation of Christ
 Jesus wearing the crown of thorns
 Crucifixion of Jesus

The cross is suspended from a ribbon of red silk with four blue stripes in the middle. On the edges at each side runs a white band broken by a dark yellow bar.

See also
 Jerusalem Cross (Prussia)
 List of ecclesiastical decorations

References

External links

 The medal of Pope Leo XIII: a sign of the Holy journey to Jerusalem (At the website of the Custody of the Holy Land)

Orders, decorations, and medals of the Holy See
1901 establishments in Vatican City